Aegialeus (also Aegealeus, Aigialeus, Egialeus) is the name of several individuals in Greek mythology or literature:

 Aegialeus (King of Sicyon), one of the sons of the river god Inachus
 Aegialeus (King of Argos), elder son of Adrastus, a king of Argos
 Aegialeus, an alternative name given by some scholars for Absyrtus, the son of Aeëtes who was murdered by Medea
 Aegialeus (strategos), general of the Achaean league in 242/1 BC
 Aigialeus, an elderly fisherman in Book V of the Ephesian Tale, an ancient Greek novel

See also
 Agesilaus II, king of Sparta from 398 to about 360 BC 

Masculine given names